Patrizio Franco Buanne (born 20 September 1978) is an Italian-Austrian baritone singer, songwriter, and producer.

Biography

Early life
Patrizio Buanne was born in Vienna, Austria to Franco and Alina Buanne; he spent his childhood living and traveling between the two grand, historical and musical cities: Vienna, which is known as “The heart of Europe”; and: Naples, Italy, also known as the capital of the Mediterranean, which he claims that shaped his upbringing and personality.

From an early age, a passion for languages grew on him. He studied Roman and Slavic languages at the University of Vienna and Rome. He speaks Neapolitan, Italian, German, English, French, Spanish and Polish; furthermore, he developed an affection for music, inspired by the classic Italian and Neapolitan songs that his parents would record from vinyl onto cassettes to be played for the clients at his father's restaurant.

He is a happily married man with a daughter who currently resides in Austria. His daughter's name is Alina Josephine.

Career
Buanne participated and won several talent competitions between the ages of 11 and 17. which led to small musical productions and gigs with his self-formed 50's rock and roll band and as a solo performer followed.

When he was 17, a music industry manager proposed a performance on the occasion of the Papal visit in Wroclaw, Poland. The song, which was half in Italian and half in Polish, had been written for the opening mass, and with 85,000 people in attendance, the exposure led to his first record named Angelo di Dio in 1997. Tragically, it was also to be the year that his father died from virulent cancer, and the subsequent grief became such that Patrizio almost lost his own life to a perforated ulcer.

At age 19, Buanne graduated from school in Vienna and moved to Naples and later Rome. There he attended university to study languages, while looking for opportunities in the entertainment industry in Italy. He was a guest performer and entertainer on Italian television shows such as Momenti di Gloria, Domenica In and Libero. This success led to a contract with a production company that made shows for RAI and Mediaset. Due to the limited offered international opportunities in Italy, Buanne started to shape his own ideas and concepts.

Buanne approached several producers with the idea of recording a collection of romantic Italian songs with an orchestra, which was his real ambition, forged by 5 years of shaping and developing his ideas as an independent artist. The objective behind recording that particular genre was, on one hand, to let people know that “Italian music is not just opera or classical”, and on the other hand, to honor his father.

The Italian (2005) 
In 2004, after years of reaching out to producers, he finally found a team that shared his goals, started to produce his album, and auditioned for several record companies, until he was signed by Lucian Grainge from Universal Music for a worldwide release. The album, The Italian, was finished in London at the Abbey Road Studios with the collaboration of the Royal Philharmonic Orchestra. Released in February 2005, after 18 months of production, it reached the top ten in the charts in the United Kingdom, and sold over 100,000 copies by the first week following its release. The album was certified gold in the UK, Austria and Finland, platinum in New Zealand, Hong Kong, Singapore, Malaysia, Thailand and Taiwan, double platinum in South Africa and even triple platinum in Australia.

Following The Italian'''s international release, Buanne performed two mayor tours in 2006, including a six-week tour of theatres and concert venues in Australia, Asia, South Africa and Europe.

His live concert DVD "Patrizio-the new voice of romance" was broadcast on the American public television network PBS, which led to his first US tour.

In October 2006, Buanne was invited by Dr. A. Kenneth Ciongoli, the chairman of the National Italian American Foundation, to perform at their annual gala in Washington, D.C. where he met the President of the United States.

 Forever Begins Tonight (2007) 
Buanne's second album, Forever Begins Tonight, was released in 2007, and reached No. 15 in the UK and No. 7 on the US Billboard World Albums Chart. The album included an Italian version of the Robbie Williams's song "Angels" (entitled "Un Angelo").

In less than two years, both of his releases, sold more than 2 million albums, even in spite of not having professional management or an international radio hit.

 Patrizio (2009) 
Given the significant success that came with both of his first albums, as well as the demand for his music in the United States by his fans, he decided that in order to take his career to the next level, he would need to spend more time in the US not only touring, but also to seek representation from some serious players within the music establishment; and thus, Mondo Buanne Productions was founded; a group of professionals around the world that consult and coordinate Patrizio's concepts, ideas and projects.

Taking this step in his career, brought the recording of Patrizio's third album, under the Warner Music label; collaborating with veteran producers, Humberto Gatica and Brian Rawlings, both of whom oversought many international hits by artists like Michael Jackson, Celine Dion, Cher and Enrique Iglesias, and recognized Patrizio's potential and were enthusiastic to be involved in his new release.

For this album, Gatica and Rawlings helped researching more tunes of the Italian songbook, that are Patrizio's trademark; but the album also featured his own contemporary and timeless interpretation of International standards, alongside new original and unpublished compositions, recorded this time in the United States, at the legendary Hollywood's Capitol Studios.

In 2011, and exactly on Patrizio's birthday, this eponymous album made it to number 5 on the US Jazz Billboard charts, and was followed by his third concert tour, through Australia, New Zealand, Asia, South Africa and the United States, where he was invited to perform with Larry King and on Late Night with Jimmy Fallon.

 Life is Beautiful - Dankie-Suid Afrika (2011) 
That same year, he released Life is Beautiful - Dankie-Suid Afrika (Universal-EMI Music), an album of South African pop standards, in which he recorded alongside singers such as Ladysmith Black Mambazo, duets in Afrikaans; as well as in Italian and English, being awarded by the South African Music Industry with the "SA’s Ambassadors Award".

 Wunderbar (2013) 
In 2013, Patrizio dedicated an album to his German speaking fans, and particularly friends that he grew up with in Vienna, named Wunderbar (Warner Music GSA); where he melts in more Italian songs he grew up with, and original compositions combining the German and Italian language.

The results of both Life is Beautiful - Dankie-Suid Afrika and Wunderbar'' were a tour through Austria, Switzerland and Germany, presented by popular show master Florian Silbereisen; and national concerts in South Africa, as well as a special guest performance and live DVD recording as the only international performer at "Classics is Groot", singing among other songs his first hit "Il Mondo", and where he invited 12 years old Dutch soprano Amira Willighagen to perform the Neapolitan classic "O Sole Mio" as a duet.

Viva la Dolce Vita (2015) 
On his fourth worldwide release, Viva la Dolce Vita (Universal Music), he remained true to his reputation as an “Ambassador for the Italian song” while also broadening his horizons by putting an international slant on his natural way with both previously published and original songs. Among the tracks, he gave spirited interpretations of Neapolitan, Sicilian and more Italian standards such as “Gli occhi miei” (Help yourself) the Tom Jones hit or Charlie Chaplin's “Smile,” in Italian.

BRAVO Patrizio (2016) 
During his worldwide promotion of Viva la Dolce Vita, his team assured him the interest of more concerts not just through the United States, but also confirming national tours in 2016 and 2017 in Australia, South Africa, Europe, Latin America and Asia; presenting Patrizio with an award for worldwide multiplatinum sales and a release of the most popular songs of his first 10 years compiled in one CD, named BRAVO Patrizio (Universal Music).

Italianissimo (2017) and Me Enamoré 
While working on his first Spanish speaking album, planning for a 2017 release, his first single, “Me Enamoré”, has been released and promoted as the main theme for the Mexican soap opera “El Vuelo de la Victoria”. His album, Italianissimo was released in February 2018. The songs he recorded for this album are Ti Amo; Su di noi; Bella notte/Non dimenticar; Volare; Ciao bambina; Eh Campari; Il cuore è uno zingaro; Brand New Word For Sexy; Only Your Love Takes Me Home; Angel; A puro dolor (Purest of Pain); Caruso; What Now My Love; Oh, Marie; Angelina/Zooma, Zooma; Esta Cobarida; Tú Y Yo; Te amo (Ti amo); Ángel; El Corazón Es Un Gitano (Il cuore è uno zingaro).

Christmas with Patrizio (2019) 
During the past 15 years, PATRIZIO has been fortunate to work with the best musicians and in the most renown recording studios in the world(Il mondo)recording beautiful and successful albums(cds) which allows him to perform countless concerts for wonderful audiences particularly in Australia, Asia, Africa, Europe and the USA. The one question that he has been asked, by his fans or journalists every year was: “when will you release a Christmas album?” of which he jokingly responded: “probably when I will get married and become a father”. 
The massive changes in the music industry due the invention of free streaming platforms on the internet have caused that CDs or DVDs are no longer selling as much as they used to and a musician really only lives from touring or other complicated business solutions. In times where all of this has caused a total confusion and uncertainties PATRIZIO preferred to step aside from this craziness for some time and has decided to let all of these ongoing changes and the confusion just fall into place and to take his personal life as a priority, rather than doing what he usually does-which is planning with his team the next project, next tour or next concert-simply work on him the man not the performer or the artist. 
Looking back at 2019 he has achieved great new chapters that are very challenging but even more so interesting-such as getting married and: becoming a father-which is the greatest thing that a man can wish for. Therefore he fulfilled his personal desires, all the necessary criteria from my bucket list and was indeed and immediately ready to work on his awaited album-YES-his first ever: Christmas album. Wishing you a “Buanne Natale”.

Celebration!-Live in South Africa DVD (2021) 
Debonair Neapolitan pop crooner Patrizio Buanne has seduced the world through the years with a masterful mix of timeless Italian standards and heartfelt originals, all rooted in the pop traditions of his homeland. As a result, he has enjoyed multi-platinum album status, millions of records sold and unforgettable performances in the most prestigious venues across the globe. 
 
The multi-lingual European-born Neapolitan showman (six languages, no less!) has recorded with the best musicians and in the most renowned recording studios in the world such as Abbey Road and Capitol Studios, but has only released one live concert performance ever, which was at the very beginning of his career. 

Audiences worldwide – including the Pope, royal families and leading politicians – have enjoyed seeing Patrizio Buanne perform live.
 
This DVD – a rare treat indeed – is a celebration of Patrizio’s career through an impressive fifteen-years in an ever-evolving music industry. 

Patrizio elevates his success by giving his legions of fans across the globe what they’ve long asked for: a DVD of his greatest hits that were recorded live from the sold out performance at the Sun Arena in Pretoria, South Africa in 2019, which also features songs from his equally long-awaited album Christmas with Patrizio Buanne. 
 
What Patrizio treasures most are the countless concerts he’s performed for fans around the world, including those in Australia, Asia, Africa, Europe, South America and North America (where he has received the honor of ‘extraordinary permanent residence of the USA’). With the elusive combination of his classic good looks, charisma, engaging stage presence and a powerful voice that effortlessly conveys real emotion, it is no wonder Patrizio has earned a reputation as one of the world’s most original, inspiring and unique performers ¬– a true ambassador of Dolce Vita!

PATRIZIO BUANNE has recorded in his career in Neapolitan, English, Italian, Spanish, French, German, Polish, Afrikaans, Japanese and Mandarin.

Discography

Studio albums

Compilation albums

References

External links
 
 

Musicians from Naples
1978 births
Traditional musicians
Living people
Italian operatic baritones
Austrian people of Italian descent
21st-century Italian male singers